Karl-Heinz Müller (born 27 August 1948) is an Austrian fencer. He competed in the individual and team épée events at the 1972 and 1976 Summer Olympics.

References

External links
 

1948 births
Living people
Austrian male épée fencers
Olympic fencers of Austria
Fencers at the 1972 Summer Olympics
Fencers at the 1976 Summer Olympics
People from Feldkirch, Vorarlberg
Sportspeople from Vorarlberg